Armando Del Debbio (November 2, 1904 – May 8, 1984), commonly known as Del Debbio, was a Brazilian football left back, who played for the Brazil national team.

Playing career
Del Debbio started his career playing for São Bento in 1919, leaving the club in 1921, to join Corinthians, where he stayed until 1931. During his stint at Corinthians, he won the Campeonato Paulista in 1922, 1923, 1924, 1928, 1929 and 1930. He joined Lazio of Italy in 1931, leaving the club in 1935 to play again for Corinthians, where he won again the Campeonato Paulista in 1937. He returned to Corinthians in 1939, winning the Campeonato Paulista and retiring during that year.

National team
Del Debbio played three games for the Brazil national team. He played his first game on February 24, 1929, against Rampla Juniors of Uruguay. His second game for the national team was played on August 1, 1930, against France. Del Debbio played his last game for Brazil on  July 2, 1931, against Ferencváros of Hungary, scoring his only goal in that game.

Coaching career
Del Debbio was hired in 1936 by São Paulo's president Manoel do Carmo Mecca to work as the club's first head coach after its rebirth. He worked as Corinthians' head coach in 1939.

Honors

Club
Corinthians
Campeonato Paulista: 1922, 1923, 1924, 1928, 1929, 1930, 1937, 1939

References

1904 births
1985 deaths
Sportspeople from Santos, São Paulo
Association football fullbacks
Brazilian footballers
Brazilian football managers
Brazil international footballers
Sport Club Corinthians Paulista players
S.S. Lazio players
Serie A players
Serie B players
Brazilian expatriate footballers
Expatriate footballers in Italy
São Paulo FC managers
Sport Club Corinthians Paulista managers
Sociedade Esportiva Palmeiras managers